Last Night is an album by blues musician Carey Bell released by the BluesWay label in 1973.

Reception

The AllMusic review by Bill Dahl stated: "Nothing flashy or outrageous here, just a meat-and-potatoes session produced by Al Smith that satisfyingly showcases Bell's charms ... backed by a combo that boasted a daunting collective experience level".

Track listing
All compositions credited to Carey Bell except where noted
 "Last Night" (Walter Jacobs) − 3:38
 "Taking You Downtown" − 3:02
 "Rosa, I Love Your Soul" − 3:31
 "I'm Worried" (Willie Dixon) − 3:28
 "Cho' Cho' Blues" − 2:38
 "Tomorrow Night" − 2:25
 "She's 19 Years Old" (McKinley Morganfield) − 2:44
 "Leaving in the Morning" (Jacobs) − 2:25
 "Love Pretty Women" − 3:23
 "Mean Mistreater" (Morganfield) − 4:18
 "Freda" − 2:10
 "I Want to See You Tomorrow Night" − 2:58

Personnel
Carey Bell – harmonica, vocals
Joe Perkins – piano
Eddie Taylor – guitar
Dave Myers − bass
Willie Smith – drums

References

Carey Bell albums
1973 albums
BluesWay Records albums